|}

The Winning Fair Juvenile Hurdle is a Grade 3 National Hunt hurdle race in Ireland. It is run at Fairyhouse in February, over a distance of about 2 miles (2,012 metres) and during the race there are ten hurdles to be jumped.
The race was first run as a Grade 3 race in 2003 and awarded Grade 2 status in 2008. It returned to Grade 3 in 2016.

Records
Most successful jockey (3 wins):
 Paul Townend -  Little Green (2011), Abbyssial (2014), Zenta (2023)

Most successful trainer (4 wins): 
 Willie Mullins -  Abbyssial (2014), Burning Victory (2020), Icare Allen (2022), Zenta (2023)

Winners

See also
 Horse racing in Ireland
 List of Irish National Hunt races

References
Racing Post:

National Hunt races in Ireland
National Hunt hurdle races
Fairyhouse Racecourse
Recurring sporting events established in 2003
2003 establishments in Ireland